Héctor Dante Cincotta (born 4 April 1943, La Plata) is an Argentine poet, scholar and literary critic, who received the Argentine National Prize for Literature in 1993, as well as other prizes. Among his more than seventy books, his poetry collections include “The Antiquity of the Clouds” (La antigüedad de las nubes, 1972, translated into English as in 1999) and “The Testimony of Days” (El testimonio de los días, 1975). Among his essayistic books are “Time and Nature in the Works of Ricardo E. Molinari” (El tiempo y la naturaleza en la obra de Ricardo E. Molinari, 1992), “Studies in Argentine Poetry” (Estudios de poesía argentina, 1994) and “Argentine Letters” (Letras Argentinas, 2012). His works have been translated into Italian, French, English, German, Chinese, Turkish etc.

Often giving lectures abroad, he has traveled extensively throughout Europe, South America and the USA. His poetry is classicist in its subject and its expression  and he regards art as a collaborative effort, therefore working with renowned illustrators as: Libero Badii, Carlos Páez Vilaró,  Raúl Soldi, Norah Borges, Aída Carballo, Leopoldo Presas, Carlos Alonso, Guillermo Roux and Ricardo Supisiche among others. He defends poetry as a philosophical and emotional expression that rarely reflects daily life in a direct way. When he writes, he speaks with a clear, musical voice close to the one of Ricardo Molinari  that does not aim to correct the surrounding social reality.

His critical works discuss themes that dominate literary debate in Latin America after the 1960s, including not only aesthetic issues but also the role of Argentine literature in Latin America, emphasizing both the unity of the region and its intrinsic diversity. A main source of inspiration are some of the authors that he explores, including Percy B. Shelley, John Keats, Robert Graves, Nicolás Guillén, Jorge Luís Borges, Alfonso Reyes, Juan Ramón Jiménez, Miguel Hernández etc.

Selected works

Poetry

 Oda italiana (1967)
 La antigüedad de las nubes (1972)
 Sobre los ríos, el amor y el aire (1973)
 El árbol (1973)
 El recuerdo  (seis sonetos a la casa) (1974)
 Una rosa transparente para Rilke (epístola) (1975)
 El testimonio de los días (1975)
 Pájaros para la muerte de Saint-John Perse (1976)
 Poesía portuguesa (1977)
 Memorial del cielo y de los pájaros (1979)
 El contemplado (1982)
 El pesaroso (1987)
 I giorni di nebia (1996)
 Esta esplendente nada del poniente (1996)
 Tres poemas par una ausencia uruguaya (2001)

Essay

 Jorge Luis Borges (1973)
 El tiempo y la naturaleza en la obra de Ricardo E. Molinari (1992)
 Estudios de poesía argentina (1994)
 El tiempo y las letras (1996)
 Poesía argentina (1997)
 Carlyle y Chatterton (2008)
 Mariano Melgar (2009)
 Letras argentinas (2012)
 Guillen y Neruda (2012)
 Perspectiva de Robert Graves (2013)

References

Argentine writers
1943 births
Living people